Insen is the second studio album in an ongoing collaboration between Japanese composer Ryuichi Sakamoto and German electronic artist Carsten Nicolai (here credited as Alva Noto). It was released on 20 March 2005 via Raster-Noton label.

Overview
The album's core sound is a blend of Sakamoto's impressionist piano melodies and Nicolai's digitally processed beats and sounds. Released in 2005 by Nicolai's Raster-Noton label, it follows the duo's debut album Vrioon, which was named album of the year in 2004 by The Wire magazine.

Reception

—Colin Buttimer, BBC

Track listing
 "Aurora" 8:52
 "Morning" 5:27
 "Logic Moon" 6:50
 "Moon" 6:07
 "Berlin" 6:17
 "Iano" 6:53
 "Avaol" 2:52

Personnel
Ryuichi Sakamoto – piano
Alva Noto – electronics

References

2005 albums
Alva Noto albums
Ryuichi Sakamoto albums
Collaborative albums
Raster-Noton albums